Crocodile Shoes is a British 13-part television drama set across two series and was made by the BBC. It was screened on BBC1 in 1994 (Series 1) and in 1996 (Series 2).

The first series, comprising seven episodes, was written by and starred Jimmy Nail as a factory worker who becomes a country and western singer. The show's eponymous theme tune "Crocodile Shoes" became a chart hit for Nail, as did the album of the same name.

A sequel, comprising six episodes, Crocodile Shoes II, followed in 1996 and the theme tune "Country Boy" was a hit for Nail too.

Paddy McAloon of Prefab Sprout supplied five original songs to the two series, all of them recorded by Jimmy Nail.

The series was re-screened on UK channel, Drama, in February 2016.

Main cast
 Jimmy Nail as Jed Shepperd
 James Wilby as Ade Lynn
 Sammy Johnson as Archie Pate
 Melanie Hill as Emma Shepperd
 Amy Madigan as Carmel Cantrell
 Burt Young as Lou Benedetti
 Brian Capron as Rex Hall
 Christopher Fairbank as Alan Clarke
 Alex Kingston as Caroline Carrison
 Elizabeth Carling as Wendy
 John Bowler as Albert Peplo
 Paul Palance as Big Chrissie
 Berwick Kaler as George
 Peter Wingfield as Danny
 Stuart Greer as Pete
 Ginny Holder as Sue Nbokei

Crew
 Jimmy Nail Scriptwriter, executive Producer
 David Richards Director (Episodes 1–3)
 Robert Knights Director (Episode 4)
 Malcolm Mowbray Director (Episode 5)
 Jen Samson Executive Producer
 Linda James Executive Producer
 Peter Schmidthausen Floor Manager

External links

BBC television dramas
1994 British television series debuts
1994 British television series endings
1990s British drama television series